Gillyflower was a 32-gun fourth rate vessel of the Kingdom of England, She started life as the Genoese merchantman Archangel Saint Michael built 1639 in Amsterdam in 1639. she was captured by the Royalist privateers in November 1650, then defected to the Parliamentarians in 1651. During the First Anglo-Dutch War she partook in the Battle of The Gabbard. After an expedition to the West Indies she was found to be unfit and was sold in June 1657.

Gillyflower was the second named vessel since it was used for a 20 bm row barge in service from 1546 to 1548.

Specifications
Her dimensions are unknown. Her builder's measure tonnage was 530 tons. She carried 32 guns with a crew of 120 personnel.

Commissioned Service

Service in the English Civil War and Commonwealth Navy
She was commissioned as Saint Michael into Royalist Navy under Captain Goulding in 1651 but deserted to the Parliamentarians the same year. She was commissioned as Gillyflower into the Parliamentary Navy in 1651 under the command of Captain John Hayward.

First Anglo-Dutch War
During the First Anglo-Dutch War she partook in the Battle of Portland as a member of Robert Blake's Fleet on 18 through to 20 February 1653. She participated in the Battle of the Gabbard as a member of White Squadron, Van Division on 2–3 June 1653. In 1654 she was under Captain Henry Fenn for an expedition to the West Indies in December 1654, returning in November 1655. She was laid up at Deptford. On 6 March 1657 she was reported to be much eaten by worm.

Disposition
Gillyflower was sold by Admiralty Order (AO) 8 June 1657 on 18 June 1657.

Citations

References

 British Warships in the Age of Sail (1603 – 1714), by Rif Winfield, published by Seaforth Publishing, England © Rif Winfield 2009, EPUB :
 Fleet Actions, 1.5 Battle off Portland (the Three Days' Battle)
 Fleet Actions, 1.7 Battle of the Gabbard
 Chapter 4 Fourth Rates - 'Small Ships', Vessels acquired from 25 March 1603, Ex-Royalist Prizes (1649-52), Gillyflower
 Ships of the Royal Navy, by J.J. Colledge, revised and updated by Lt-Cdr Ben Warlow and Steve Bush, published by Seaforth Publishing, Barnsley, Great Britain, © the estate of J.J. Colledge, Ben Warlow and Steve Bush 2020, EPUB , Section Section G (Gillyflower)
 The Arming and Fitting of English Ships of War 1800 - 1815, by Brian Lavery, published by US Naval Institute Press © Brian Lavery 1989, Part V Guns, Type of Guns

Ships of the line of the Royal Navy
1650s ships
Ships of the English navy